Cheryl Buckley (born 1956) is a British design historian whose research has focused on feminist approaches to design history. She has published on British ceramic design and fashion. Her works include the influential article "Made in Patriarchy: Toward a Feminist Analysis of Women and Design" (1986) and the books Potters and Paintresses (1990) and Designing Modern Britain (2007). She was professor of professor of design history at Northumbria University and subsequently she was Professor of fashion and design history at the University of Brighton, and from 2021, she is Emerita Professor at the University of Brighton.

Education and career
Buckley attended the University of East Anglia, gaining a degree in history of art and architecture (1977). She received a masters degree in design history from Newcastle University (1982). She returned to the University of East Anglia for her PhD in design history, awarded in 1991. She worked from 1980 at Newcastle Polytechnic in Newcastle-upon-Tyne, renamed Northumbria University in 1992, latterly as professor of design history, before joining the University of Brighton in 2013, where she is professor of fashion and design history. In 2017, she and Jeremy Aynsley established the Centre for Design History at Brighton. 

In 2000, she co-founded the journal Visual Culture in Britain. She chaired the Design History Society (2006–09) and served as editor-in-chief of its journal, the Journal of Design History (2011–16).

Research and writings
Buckley states her current research interests as gender and design, and has been described as a feminist design historian. She has published on ceramic design and fashion, focusing on Britain from the mid-Victorian era to the present day. Her article "Made in Patriarchy: Toward a Feminist Analysis of Women and Design", published in Design Issues in 1986, opens:

In the article, described as "seminal" by Victor Margolin and "ground-breaking" by Grace Lees-Maffei, Buckley teases out design contributions made by women, and suggests that craft arts have been ignored in the study of design history. Margolin critiques Buckley's article for overlooking design-related technologies, where he states many inventions by women have been documented. In 2021, she published an article that reflected on these themes several decades later in ‘Re-searching Women and Design’, in, eds.  Mareis, C &  Paim, N, Design Struggles, Plural, Valiz, Amsterdam, 2021.

In her first book, Potters and Paintresses: Women Designers in the Pottery Industry, 1870–1955 (1990), Buckley discusses the participation of women in ceramic design during this period, and in particular the methods by which they have successfully negotiated their lives as designers. Her PhD formed the basis for this book, entitled "Women designers in the north Staffordshire pottery industry, 1914–1940".

In Fashioning the Feminine: Representation and Women's Fashion from the Fin de Siècle to the Present (2002), Buckley and co-author Hilary Fawcett review fashion in Britain from 1890, highlighting its interaction with both feminism and femininity.  

In 2007 , she wrote her third book Designing Modern Britain, in which she surveyed British design between 1890 and 2001, broadly chronologically via numerous case studies. She employs a broad definition of design, which she considers "a matrix of interdependent practices", encompassing architecture, town planning, interior design, pottery, textiles, fashion and retail. 

More recently, Buckley co-authored with Hazel Clark, Fashion and Everyday Life: London and New York that explores the ways in which fashion is part of everyday lives focusing on London and New York in the 2oth century.(2017).

Selected publications
Books

Source:

Research articles

References

External link
 Profile at the University of Brighton

1956 births
Living people
Alumni of the University of East Anglia
Alumni of Newcastle University
Academics of Northumbria University
Academics of the University of Brighton
Design researchers
Social historians
Women art historians
20th-century English historians
21st-century English historians
20th-century English women writers
21st-century English women writers